Alessandra Scatena Gherbali, known simply as Alessandra Scatena (born 30 September 1975 in São Bernardo do Campo), is a Brazilian TV presenter.

She became well-known from her work as a stage assistant on the TV programme Domingo Legal, where she worked for 12 years until April 2001.

Also, currently works as a master of ceremonies.

Career 
Before becoming a stage assistant on Domingo Legal, Scatena was also a stage assistant on SBT's Passa ou Repassa (Pass or Re-Pass).

From the highlight as a stage assistant on Domingo Legal, Alessandra became famous and gained prominence in the media.

In 1997, she starred in the music video for the song Proibida pra Mim, by Charlie Brown Jr.

At the São Paulo Carnival in 2001, she paraded for the Nenê de Vila Matilde School. In the same year, she took part in the first edition of the reality show Casa dos Artistas, being the first to be eliminated.

She also had her own show, the Alessandra Scatena Program, on Rede Brasil television. She even participated in the show A Turma do Didi, on TV Globo.

After 16 years, in 2020, she returned to TV, as presenter of the program “Festival of Prizes”, on RedeTV!.

Television 

 Domingo Legal
 Casa dos Artistas 1
 Programa Alessandra Scatena
 Sounds of Brazil
 A Turma do Didi

Magazines 
Among the numerous magazine covers, Alessandra has starred on the cover of the following men's magazines:

 Playboy magazine⁣ – September 1997
 Playboy Special Stars (with giant poster) – October 1998

Personal life 
At 15, she dated Gugu Liberato for nine months. When she was working on the TV show Domingo Legal, she was sung to by Spanish singer Julio Iglesias.

She was married for 23 years to businessman Rogerio Gherbali, who died of complications from the new coronavirus on July 30, 2020, aged 56. She and the couple's sons were also diagnosed with Covid-19 at the end of June, but have recovered well. Her sons are Enrico Scatena Gherbali and Estéfano Scatena Gherbali.

References 

1975 births
Living people
Converts to Protestantism
Brazilian television presenters